N77 may refer to:
 , a submarine of the Royal Navy
 N77 highway, in the Philippines
 N77 road (Ireland)
 Ngalakgan language
 Nokia N77, a mobile phone